Manon Nummerdor-Flier (born 8 February 1984 in Nieuwleusen, Overijssel) is a retired volleyball player from the Netherlands, who plays as an opposite.

Career
Flier was named Most Valuable Player at the 2007 FIVB World Grand Prix in Ningbo, PR China, where the Dutch national team won the gold medal.

Flier lost the bronze medal at the 2010–11 CEV Champions League after her team Scavolini Pesaro was defeated 3–1 by the Turkish Fenerbahçe Acıbadem. She was individually awarded "Best Spiker".

In July 2011, Toray Arrows announced that she was joining for the 2011–12 season.

Flier won the bronze medal with Igtisadchi Baku in the 2013–14 Azerbaijan Super League and the Best Server award.

In 2015, she played with the Dutch National Team at the 2015 European Games in Baku, Azerbaijan.
Flier started her volleyball career at Flash Nieuwleusen in 1992 and is the most experienced player of the current team with 406 international matches.

Personal
Flier is married to the Dutch beach volleyball player Reinder Nummerdor. They have been a couple since 2005 and have lived together in Zwolle since 2012. They married on 14 June 2014 and a daughter was born in July 2016.

Clubs
 Volco Ommen (1999–2001)
 Pollux Oldenzaal (2001–2002)
 VC Weert (2002–2004)
 Sant'Orsola Asystel Novara (2004–2005)
 Dela Martinus Amstelveen (2005–2008)
 Monte Schiavo Banca Marche Jesi (2008–2009)
 Asystel Volley Novara (2009–2010)
 Scavolini Pesaro (2010–2011)
 Toray Arrows (2011–2012)
 Azerrail Baku (2012–2013)
 Igtisadchi Baku (2013–2014)
 Fujian Xi Meng Bao (2014–2015)

Awards

Individuals
 2007 FIVB World Grand Prix "Most Valuable Player"
 2009 FIVB World Grand Prix "Best Scorer"
 2009 FIVB World Grand Prix "Best Server"
 2009 European Championships "Most Valuable Player"
 2010–11 CEV Champions League Final Four "Best Spiker"
 2013-14 Azerbaijan Super League "Best Server"

Clubs
 2002 Netherlands League Championship  – Champion, with Pollux Oldenzaal
 2002 Netherlands Cup – Champion, with Pollux Oldenzaal
 2005 Italian Supercup – Champion, with Sant'Orsola Asystel Novara
 2006 Netherlands League Championship  – Champion, with Dela Martinus Amstelveen
 2006 Netherlands Cup – Champion, with Dela Martinus Amstelveen
 2007 Netherlands Cup – Champion, with Dela Martinus Amstelveen
 2007 Netherlands League Championship  – Champion, with Dela Martinus Amstelveen
 2008 Netherlands League Championship  – Champion, with Dela Martinus Amstelveen
 2008 Netherlands Cup – Champion, with Dela Martinus Amstelveen
 2009 Challenge Cup – Champion, with Monte Schiavo Banca Marche Jesi
 2013-14 Azerbaijan Super League –  3rd place, with Igtisadchi Baku

References

External links
 Official website
 FIVB profile
 Dutch Volleyball Federation
 Italian League profile

1984 births
Living people
Dutch women's volleyball players
People from Dalfsen
Dutch expatriate sportspeople in Italy
Dutch expatriate sportspeople in Japan
Expatriate volleyball players in Italy
Igtisadchi Baku volleyball players
Opposite hitters
Expatriate volleyball players in Azerbaijan
Expatriate volleyball players in China
Dutch expatriate sportspeople in China
Dutch expatriate sportspeople in Azerbaijan
Sportspeople from Overijssel
Expatriate volleyball players in Japan